Mayken Verhulst (1518–1596 or 1599), also known as Marie Bessemers, was a sixteenth-century miniature, tempera and watercolor painter, identified by Lodovico Guicciardini in 1567 as one of the four most important female artists in the Low Countries. She was actively engaged in the workshop of her husband, Pieter Coecke van Aelst, posthumously publishing his works. While she is recognized as an exceptionally skilled artist, little is known about her works or life as there are few surviving attributable sources of information.

Life
Mayken Verhulst was born in Mechelen in 1518.  She was the second wife of the painter Pieter Coecke van Aelst, and the mother-in-law of Pieter Brueghel the Elder, and, according to Karel van Mander, the first teacher of her grandsons Pieter Brueghel the Younger and Jan Brueghel the Elder. Her sister Lysbeth was married to the engraver and painter Hubert Goltzius, and her sister Barbara was married to the painter Jacob de Punder.

According to Slater (2019), she died in Brussels in 1596, approximately eighty years old., but most authority notices state that she died in Malines in 1599.

Works
Following Pieter Coecke's death in 1550, she likely oversaw the publication of a large woodcut series Ces Moeurs et Fachons de Faire des Turcz (Manners and Customs of the Turks) (1553). This print was originally designed by van Aelst as a tapestry design, strategically published by Verhulst as a print after his death to showcase his work. Additionally, she waited until about twenty years following her husband's death to publicize his legacy, argued by Di Furia as an intentional decision meant to honor Charles V, a great admirer of Turkish culture, as he withdrew from public service in 1555. Thus, Verhulst displayed great agency through her strategy, independence, and creativity.

No works survive that can be securely attributed to Verhulst, although she is frequently identified as the person behind several works assigned to the Master of the Brunswick Monogram.

Verhulst may also have been the author of a painting in the Kunsthaus Zürich with a self-portrait with her husband (panel, 50.5 x 59 cm).

Legacy

Status 
While little is definitively known about her life and works, Guicciardini's Descrittione places her alongside Susanna Horenbout, Levina Teerlinc, and Caterina van Hemessen, suggesting her remarkable talents.

Impact 
Verhulst was the first teacher of her grandsons, Pieter Brueghal the Younger and Jan Brueghal the Elder, both of which are prolific Northern Renaissance Master painters. Ironically, her close relation to such prominent artists has muted her long-lasting effect on art history, as she is most often mentioned within discussions of their heritage as opposed to her accomplishments.

Published by Mayken Verhulst, her husband's composition Ces Moeurs et fachons de faire de Turcz now resides at the Metropolitan Museum of Art, evidencing her significant impact on Northern Renaissance printmaking.

Surviving artifacts 
Her house and former painter's workshop,  is a historic monument in Mechelen. It is a museum named .

Zurich's Kunstaus houses the only possible surviving portrait of Verhulst.

Notes

Sources
 Bergmans, Simone. "Le Problème de Jan van Hemessen, monogrammatiste de Brunswick," in Revue belge d'archéologie et d'histoire de l'art, vol. 24, 1955, pp. 133–57.
 Di Furia, Arthur J., "Towards an Understanding of Mayken Verhulst and Volcxken Diericx", in Women Artists and Patrons in the Netherlands, 1500–1700 edited by Elizabeth A.  Sutton, 157-177. Amsterdam: Amsterdam University Press, 2019.
 Greer, Germaine. The Obstacle Race, p. 26.
 King, Catherine. "Looking a Sight: Sixteenth-Century Portraits of Woman Artists," in Zeitschrift für Kunstgeschichte, vol. 58, 1995, pp. 381–406.
 Op de Beeck, Jan. "Pieter Bruegel, Mayken Verhulst en Mechelen". In: De Zotte Schilders. (p. 17–29. Ed. Snoeck.2003. .
 Op de Beeck, Jan, Mayken Verhulst (1518–1599). The Turkish Manners of an Artistic Lady. Mechelen: Museum Het Zotte Kunstkabinet, 2005. .
 Piland, Sherry, Women artists : an historical, contemporary and feminist bibliography. London: The Scarecrow Press. 1994.
 Ruby, Louisa Wood, "An early wooded landscape by Jan Brueghel the Elder", The Burlington Magazine, 1312, vol. 154 (2012): 476–481.
 Slater, Alexis Diane, Mayken Verhulst: A Professional Woman Painter and Print Publisher in the Sixteenth-Century Low Countries. Austin: The University of Texas at Austin, 2019.
 "Woodcut offers panoramic view of 16th-century Muslim life." Yale Bulletin & Calendar 18 January 2002. (accessed 21 May 2007)
 Haar naam was Mayken 

1518 births
1599 deaths
Artists from Mechelen
Flemish Renaissance painters
Flemish women painters
Portrait miniaturists
Flemish printmakers
Bruegel family
Women printmakers
16th-century women artists
16th-century printers
Artists from the Habsburg Netherlands